The 1964 European Rowing Championships for women were rowing championships held on the Khimki Reservoir, which is part of the Moscow Canal, in Khimki near Moscow in the Soviet Union. The competition for men had been held the previous month in Copenhagen. The regatta in Khimki was held from 6 to 8 September. Five boat classes were contested (W1x, W2x, W4x+, W4+, W8+). Eleven countries nominated a total of 33 boats for the regatta, which was held over 1,000 metres. Five lanes were available and this meant that in three boat classes, there was only the final: W2x, W4+, and W8+.

German participation
FISA did not recognise East Germany as a country and insisted on one German team per boat class. The selection trials were won by West Germany in the single sculls boat class (Karen Wolf), but the other four boat classes were won by East Germany. Wolf came fifth in the final in Khimki.

Medal summary – women's events
On the day of the finals, it rained heavily and there was a strong crosswind. Those rowers in the lane closest to the shore were least affected by the wind. The singles as the smallest boats are most affected, and the British medal favourite, Penny Chuter, hit the buoys twice and came fourth, and the previous European champion, Alena Postlová, capsized.

Medals table
The Soviet Union won all five gold medals. Other countries that competed in the finals but did not win medals were Great Britain, West Germany, the Netherlands, and Poland. Valentina Tereshkova, the first women who had travelled to space in June 1963, donated a crystal cup that was won by the Soviet team for being the most successful country.

References

European Rowing Championships
European Rowing Championships
Rowing
Rowing
Rowing
Khimki
Sports competitions in Moscow
1963 in women's rowing